Simon Phillips may refer to:

Simon Phillips (drummer) (born 1957), English jazz, pop and rock drummer and producer
Simon Phillips (actor) (born 1980), British actor and film producer
Simon Phillips (director) (born 1958), New Zealand-Australian stage director
Simon Phillips (footballer) (born 1987), Australian rules footballer
Simon Phillips (producer), with The Orb
Simon Phillips (rugby league) (born 1983), Australian rugby league footballer